Sara Troost, or Sara Ploos van Amstel (1732–1803) was an 18th-century painter from the Northern Netherlands.

Biography
Troost was born and died in Amsterdam.  According to the RKD, she was the daughter of the painter Cornelis Troost and the teacher of her cousin Christina Chalon. She married the printer Jacob Ploos van Amstel, and her sister Elisabeth married his brother, Cornelis Ploos van Amstel. Like him, she is known for watercolor copies of 17th century artists.

References

 Sarah Troost and Sara Ploos van Amstel on Artnet
 Sarah Troost

1732 births
1803 deaths
18th-century Dutch painters
Painters from Amsterdam
Dutch women painters
18th-century Dutch women artists